The 2012 NCAA Division I baseball season, play of college baseball in the United States organized by the National Collegiate Athletic Association (NCAA) at the Division I level, began on February 17, 2012. The season progressed through the regular season, many conference tournaments and championship series, and concluded with the 2012 NCAA Division I baseball tournament and 2012 College World Series. The College World Series, consisting of the eight remaining teams in the NCAA tournament and held annually in Omaha, Nebraska, at TD Ameritrade Park concluded on June 25, 2012 with the final game of the best of three championship series. Arizona defeated two-time defending champion South Carolina two games to none to claim their fourth championship.

Realignment

New programs
Nebraska-Omaha joined Division I from the Division II MIAA.

Dropped programs
Cleveland State dropped its varsity baseball program following the 2011 season. Two programs which had competed as Division I Independents, Le Moyne and New Orleans, dropped to Division II. Centenary, which had been a member of The Summit League, dropped to Division III.

Conference changes

Several conferences added single programs prior to the 2012 season. The Pac-12 Conference added Utah, previously a Mountain West Conference member, and the West Coast Conference added BYU, also a previous Mountain West member. Nebraska moved from the Big 12 Conference to the Big Ten Conference. Campbell moved from the Atlantic Sun Conference to the Big South Conference.

Three Independents joined conferences prior to the season. Savannah State and North Carolina Central both joined the Mid-Eastern Athletic Conference, while SIU Edwardsville joined the Ohio Valley Conference.

Conference formats
With the addition of Savannah State and North Carolina Central, the Mid-Eastern Athletic Conference split into two divisions, the North and the South.

Season outlook

Conference standings

Conference winners and tournaments
Thirty athletic conferences each end their regular seasons with a single-elimination tournament or a double-elimination tournament. The teams in each conference that win their regular season title are given the number one seed in each tournament. The winners of these tournaments receive automatic invitations to the 2012 NCAA Division I baseball tournament, with the exception of the Great West Conference, as that league remains in a provisional status.

College World Series

The 2012 season marked the sixty sixth NCAA Baseball Tournament, which culminated with the eight team College World Series.  The College World Series was held in Omaha, Nebraska.  The eight teams played a double-elimination format, with Arizona claiming their fourth championship with a two games to none series win over South Carolina in the final.

Bracket

Award winners

Consensus All-American teams

Major player of the year awards
Dick Howser Trophy: Mike Zunino, Florida
Baseball America: Mike Zunino, Florida
Collegiate Baseball/Louisville Slugger: Nick Petree, Missouri State
American Baseball Coaches Association: James Ramsey, Florida State
Golden Spikes Award: Mike Zunino, Florida

Major freshman of the year awards
Baseball America Freshman Of The Year: Carlos Rodon, NC State
Collegiate Baseball Freshman Player of the Year: Michael Conforto, Oregon State
Collegiate Baseball Freshman Pitcher of the Year: Carlos Rodon, NC State

Major coach of the year awards
American Baseball Coaches Association:
Baseball America:
Collegiate Baseball Coach of the Year:
National Collegiate Baseball Writers Association (NCBWA) National Coach of the Year: Matt Senk, Stony Brook
Chuck Tanner Collegiate Baseball Manager of the Year Award:
ABCA/Baseball America Assistant Coach of the Year:

Other major awards
Lowe's Senior CLASS Award (baseball) (outstanding Senior of the Year in baseball): James Ramsey, Florida State
Johnny Bench Award (Catcher of the Year): Mike Zunino, Florida
Brooks Wallace Award (Shortstop of the Year): Zach Vincej, Pepperdine
American Baseball Coaches Association Gold Glove:

See also

2012 NCAA Division I baseball rankings
2012 NCAA Division I baseball tournament
2012 College World Series

References
Notes